Marais is a masculine given name. Notable people with the name include:

Marais Erasmus (born 1964), South African cricketer and umpire 
Marais Viljoen (1915–2007), the last ceremonial State President of South Africa from 1979 until 1984

Masculine given names